Lamon is both a surname and a given name. Some notable people with the name include:

 Francesco Lamon (born 1994), Italian track and road cyclist
 Georgie Lamon (1934–2016), Swiss politician
 Isabel Lamon (1898–1958), American actress in silent films
 Jeanne Lamon (21st century), Canadian violinist
 Laurie Lamon (21st century), American poet
 Sophie Lamon (born 1985), Swiss Olympic fencer
 Ward Hill Lamon (1828–1893), American lawyer
 Lamon Brewster (born 1973), American heavyweight
 Lamon Archey (born 1981), American actor

Claude Lamon (born 1975), French Trumpeter